The Getty Villa is at the easterly end of the Malibu coast in the Pacific Palisades neighborhood of Los Angeles, California, United States. One of two campuses of the J. Paul Getty Museum, the Getty Villa is an educational center and museum dedicated to the study of the arts and cultures of ancient Greece, Rome, and Etruria. The collection has 44,000 Greek, Roman, and Etruscan antiquities dating from 6,500 BC to 400 AD, including the Lansdowne Heracles and the Victorious Youth. The UCLA/Getty Master's Program in Archaeological and Ethnographic Conservation is housed on this campus.

History

In 1954, oil tycoon J. Paul Getty opened a gallery adjacent to his home in Pacific Palisades.  Quickly running out of room, he built a second museum, the Getty Villa, on the property down the hill from the original gallery. The villa design was inspired by the Villa of the Papyri at Herculaneum and incorporated additional details from several other ancient sites. It was designed by architects Robert E. Langdon, Jr., and Ernest C. Wilson, Jr., in consultation with archeologist Norman Neuerburg. It opened in 1974, but was never visited by Getty, who died in 1976. Following his death, the museum inherited $661 million and began planning a much larger campus, the Getty Center, in nearby Brentwood. The museum overcame neighborhood opposition to its new campus plan by agreeing to limit the total size of the development on the Getty Center site.  To meet the museum's total space needs, the museum decided to split between the two locations with the Getty Villa housing the Greek, Roman, and Etruscan antiquities. In 1993, the Getty Trust selected the Boston architects Rodolfo Machado and Jorge Silvetti to design a renovation of the Getty Villa and its campus. In 1997, portions of the museum's collection of Greek, Roman and Etruscan antiquities were moved to the Getty Center for display, and the Getty Villa was closed for renovation.  The collection was restored during the renovation.

In 2004, during the renovation, the museum and the University of California, Los Angeles (UCLA), began holding summer institutes in Turkey, studying the conservation of Middle Eastern Art.

Reopened on January 28, 2006, the Getty Villa shows Greek, Roman, and Etruscan antiquities within Roman-inspired architecture and surrounded by Roman-style gardens.  The art is arranged by themes, e.g., Gods and Goddesses, Dionysos and the Theater,  and Stories of the Trojan War. The new architectural plan surrounding the Villa – which was conceived by Machado and Silvetti Associates (who were also responsible for the plans for the renovated museum) – is designed to simulate an archaeological dig. Architectural Record has praised their work on the Getty Villa as "a near miracle – a museum that elicits no smirks from the art world ... a masterful job ... crafting a sophisticated ensemble of buildings, plazas, and landscaping that finally provides a real home for a relic of another time and place."

In 2016–2018 the collection was reinstalled in a chronological arrangement emphasizing art-historical themes.

There has been controversy surrounding the Greek and Italian governments' claim that objects in the collection were looted and should be repatriated. In 2006, the Getty returned or promised to return four looted objects to Greece: a stele (grave marker), a marble relief, a gold funerary wreath, and a marble statue. In 2007, the Getty signed an agreement to return 40 looted items to Italy.

The building was closed to visitors in mid-March 2020, but as of 5 June 2021 is now open to the public again.

The villa was host to leaders of the Western Hemisphere for dinner, held by President Joe Biden and First Lady Jill Biden in honor of the 9th Summit of the Americas on June 9, 2022, which was a first for the Villa.

Facility and programs

The Getty Villa hosts live performances in both its indoor auditorium and its outdoor theatre.  Indoor play-readings included The Trojan Women, Aristophanes' The Frogs, and Euripides' Helen.  Indoor musical performances, which typically relate to art exhibits, included: Musica Angelica, De Organographia, and Songs from the Fifth Age: Sones de México in Concert. The auditorium also held a public reading of Homer's Iliad. Outdoor performances included Aristophanes' Peace, Aeschylus's Agamemnon, and Sophocles' Elektra.  The Getty Villa also hosts visiting exhibitions beyond its own collections. For example, in March 2011 "In Search of Biblical Lands" was a photographic exhibition which included scenes of the Middle East dating back to the 1840s.

The Getty Villa offers special educational programs for children. A special Family Forum gallery offers activities including decorating Greek vases and projecting shadows onto a screen that represents a Greek urn.  The room also has polystyrene props from Greek and Roman culture for children to handle and use to cast shadows.  The Getty Villa also offers children's guides to the other exhibits.

The Getty Conservation Institute offers a Master's Program in Archaeological and Ethnographic Conservation in association with the Cotsen Institute of Archaeology at UCLA. Classes and research are conducted in the museum wing of the ranch house. The program was the first of its kind in the United States.

Campus

The Villa self-identifies with Malibu as it is located just east of the city limits of Malibu  in the city of Los Angeles in the community of Pacific Palisades. An outdoor  entry pavilion is also built into the hill near the 248-car, four story, South Parking garage at the southern end of the Outer Peristyle. To the west of the Museum is a 450-seat outdoor Greek theater where evening performances are staged, named in honor of Barbara and Lawrence Fleischman. The theater faces the west side of the Villa and uses its entrance as a stage. To the northwest of the theatre is a three-story,  building built into the hill that contains the museum store on the lower level, a cafe on the second level, and a private dining room on the top level. North of the Villa is a  indoor 250-seat auditorium. On the hill above the museum are Getty's original private ranch house and the museum wing that Getty added to his home in 1954. They are now used for curatorial offices, meeting rooms and as a library.
Although not open to the public, the campus includes J. Paul Getty's grave on the hill behind his ranch house. A 200-car North Parking Garage is behind the ranch complex. The  museum building is arranged in a square opening into the Inner Peristyle courtyard. The 2006 museum renovation added 58 windows facing the Inner Peristyle and a retractable skylight over the atrium. It also replaced the terrazzo floors in the galleries and added seismic protection with new steel reinforcing beams and new isolators in the bases of statues and display cases. The museum has  of gallery space.

Writing in 2008, the architectural critic Calum Storrie described the overall effect:

What the Getty Villa achieves, first by seclusion, then by control of access, and ultimately through the architecture, is a sense of detachment from its immediate environment.

Gardens
There are four different gardens on the grounds of the Getty Villa, planted with plants native to the Mediterranean and known to have been cultivated by the ancient Romans. The largest garden is that of the Outer Peristyle, an exact proportional replica of the one at the Villa dei Papiri. Traditional Roman landscaping designs are replicated with manicured bay laurel, boxwood, oleander, and viburnum shrubs. There are rows of date palms lining each of the long sides of the Outer Peristyle garden, while each corner features pomegranate trees surrounded by ornamental plants like acanthus, ivy, hellebore, lavender, and iris. Copies of Roman bronzes excavated at the Villa dei Papiri and elsewhere are scattered throughout the garden.

Just west of the Outer Peristyle is the Herb Garden, where traditional herbs sourced from ancient Roman texts are cultivated along with a variety of fruit trees: pomegranate, fig, apricot, apple, citrus, and pear. The garden is surrounded by grapevines, and bounded by an olive grove planted on terraces above the garden. The East Garden is small and secluded, surrounded by laurel and plane trees. Its chief feature is an exact replica of the famous shell and mosaic fountain at the House of the Great Fountain in Pompeii, but there is also a circular fountain at the center of a basin filled with aquatic plants, around which the garden is oriented. The fourth and final garden is that of the Inner Peristyle. Like the Outer Peristyle, a long, narrow, marble lined pool forms the centerpiece of the landscaping; along each side are replicas of bronze female statues from the Villa dei Papiri, modelled to appear as if they are drawing water from the pool. In each corner of the garden is a replica white marble fountain, and there are also several bronze copies of famous Greek sculptures like the Doryphoros and busts of Greek philosophers like Pythagoras and Democritus.

Collection

The collection has 44,000 Greek, Roman, and Etruscan antiquities dating from 6,500 BC to 400 AD, of which approximately 1,400 are on view.

Among the outstanding items is Victorious Youth, one of few life-size Greek bronze statues to have survived to modern times. The Lansdowne Heracles is a Hadrianic Roman sculpture in the manner of Lysippus. The Villa also has jewelry and coin collections and an extensive 20,000 volume library of books covering art from these periods. The Villa also displays the Getty kouros, which the museum lists as "Greek, about 530 B.C., or modern forgery" because scientific analysis is inconclusive as to whether the marble statue can be dated to Greek times. If genuine, the Getty kouros is one of only twelve remaining intact lifesize kouroi.

GettyGuide
Detailed information about the J. Paul Getty Museum's collection at the Getty Villa is provided on "GettyGuide". This is available both at the Museum, at various points known as "GettyGuide stations", and externally on its website.

Gallery

See also
 Camillo Paderni described parts the Villa of the Papyri

Notes

References

External links 

 Getty.edu: official Getty Villa website
 Getty.edu: J. Paul Getty Trust website
  – GNIS data
 Vimeo.com: four-part documentary video about the Getty Villa and its Roman model, the Villa of the Papyri
 Flickr.com: photos tagged with "Getty Villa"

Art museums and galleries in Los Angeles
Gardens in California
Museums of ancient Rome in the United States
Museums of ancient Greece in the United States
Sculpture galleries in the United States
Sculpture gardens, trails and parks in California
Pacific Palisades, Los Angeles
Villa
Art museums established in 1954
1954 establishments in California
Buildings and structures completed in 1974
1970s architecture in the United States
Villas in the United States
Replica buildings